Up is the second studio album by Canadian band Great Big Sea released on September 12, 1995.  The album is certified 4× platinum in Canada.

Track listing

Singles 
"Going Up" peaked at #70 on the Canadian Singles Chart
"Fast As I Can" peaked at #50 on the Canadian Singles Chart

References

External links 
Up page at the Official GBS Website

1995 albums
Great Big Sea albums
Warner Music Group albums